David George Llewellyn,  (born 14 December 1960) has been Vice-Chancellor of Harper Adams University since 2009 

Born in Cardiff, he was educated at University College London (BSc), Birkbeck, University of London (MSc) and the University of Bath (DBA).

Llewellyn was appointed Commander of the Order of the British Empire (CBE) in the 2022 New Year Honours for services to higher education, the agri-food chain and rural industries.

References

1960 births
Living people
Alumni of University College London
Alumni of Birkbeck, University of London
Alumni of the University of Bath
People associated with Harper Adams University
Commanders of the Order of the British Empire